The 2005 Asian Badminton Championships was the 24th edition of the Asian Badminton Championships. It was held in Hyderabad, India from 6 September – 11 September 2005 as a four-star tournament.

Medalists

Medal table

Results

Finals

Semi-finals

References 
https://www.badmintoncentral.com/forums/index.php?threads/asian-badminton-championships-semi-final.26740/page-7
https://www.badmintoncentral.com/forums/index.php?threads/asian-badminton-championships-final.26752/

External links
 Draws and results - BadmintonAsia.org (.xls)

Badminton Asia Championships
Asian Badminton Championships
Badminton tournaments in India